This is a list of neighbourhoods in the urban core of Greater Sudbury, Ontario. This list includes only those neighbourhoods that fall within the pre-2001 city limits of Sudbury — for communities within the former suburban municipalities, see the articles Capreol, Nickel Centre, Onaping Falls, Rayside-Balfour, Valley East and Walden.

Downtown
The downtown of Sudbury is bounded by Ste-Anne Road/Davidson Street (1909) pg 12 to the north, Douglas Street (1909) pg 13 at Brady (1905) pg 6/Elgin Street at Howey Drive to the south, Kitchener Street to the east and Alder Street to the west, and includes one of the city's largest concentration of retail businesses and offices.

The downtown core was the city's original neighbourhood, which was filled with early settler log cabins, none of which currently exist.

An urban renewal project in the 1960s under expropriations saw the historic downtown Borgia Street (1890) pg 61 neighbourhood demolished  in favour of a large shopping mall facility, (originally known as the City Centre, the Rainbow Centre, and now known as "Elm Place" in July 2020)  a realignment and expansion of Notre-Dame Avenue, a low rental tenement and a further expropriation for land to build Tom Davies Square, the city's modern city hall. A parcel of this land adjacent to the city hall was later donated by the city to the Sudbury Theatre Centre. The city also attracted national press attention in the 1970s for the creation of St. Andrew's Place, a multi purpose church facility, which incorporates a small chapel, retail space and a seniors' housing apartment tower, where two historic stone churches once stood.

With retail businesses in the city increasingly locating outside of the downtown core, particularly in the Four Corners, Kingsway and Lasalle Boulevard areas, the city has struggled in recent years to maintain a vibrant downtown. Recent projects have included the creation of Market Square, a farmers' and craft market, the redevelopment of the Rainbow Centre mall, streetscape beautification projects, and the creation of the Downtown Sudbury Business Improvement Area in 1977. This organization works to improve the downtown through policy development, advocacy, special events and economic development. Although the city is in existence today because of the construction of the rail in this area of the province, at various times over the past 50 years, the city and community groups have proposed that the city purchase the CPR stockyards west of Elgin Street in order to expand the downtown area, although to date this has not been pursued. The farmers' market and historic CPR Ticket and Telegraph Building will be the site for Northern Ontario School of Architecture.

One of downtown Sudbury's more unusual features is a five-acre park on the hill on Van Horne Drive in the southeast corner of the neighbourhood, centred on a grotto dedicated to Our Lady of Lourdes. The grotto was erected in 1907 on the private estate of Frédéric Romanet du Caillaud, a wealthy lawyer, writer and nobleman from Limoges, France who became one of Sudbury's first significant private landowners after moving to the city five years earlier. After Romanet du Caillaud's death, ownership of the site passed to a local businessman's family, and then to a succession of community committees. A pathway depicting the Stations of the Cross was later added to the adjoining parkland in 1958. The site later fell into disrepair, and following a vandalism incident in 1993 it was taken over by the Roman Catholic Diocese of Sault Ste. Marie, which refurbished the park and continues to operate it as a public outdoor shrine.

In 2010, the city announced that it was investigating the process of having the downtown core designated as a heritage district, even though it has demolished many of its heritage sites such as the Edwardian Architecture dimension stone Federal Building, built in 1915 "despite the war", boasting a 90-foot clock tower which housed four faced clocks with carillon made in England, clock faced in opal glass and topped with copper dome. It was the only pentagonal Federal Building built in Canada. The Nickel Range Hotel, a five star hotel also built in 1915, hosted King George VI and his wife Queen Elizabeth during their state visit. Most of the architecturally important buildings have since been demolished. See also List of historic places in Greater Sudbury.

Notable landmarks 
 Tom Davies Square - 200 Brady Street (Brady and Paris) Public square with white office buildings. Bordered by Brady Street, Minto Street, Larch Street and Paris Street.
 CP Rail Station - 233 Elgin Street (Elgin and Minto) Former Canadian Pacific passenger rail station. Current location of Market Square. Designated Federal heritage site
 CPR Ticket and Telegraph Building - 49 Elgin Street (Elgin and Elm). Two-storey red brick building.
 Mackey Building - 56 Elm Street (Elm and Durham) Five-storey, brown brick office building.
 The Grand Opera House - 28 Elgin Street (Elgin and Beech) Four-storey brick nightclub with apartments and storefronts.
 Christ the King Church - 30 Beech Street (Beech and Durham). Roman Catholic Church with two bell towers.

Flour Mill

The Flour Mill neighbourhood is centred on Notre-Dame Avenue and Kathleen Street, immediately north of downtown Sudbury, from Jogues Street to Wilma Street, including the New Flour Mill business area north of Wilma St. to the Pioneer Manor. The neighbourhood around Leslie Street and Mountain Street was known as Primeauville, in honour of a local priest. The residential area Mont-Brébeuf with Collège Notre-Dame is part of this neighbourhood. In French, the community is known as le Moulin-à-Fleur. It is the French Quarter of the city. The French word "fleur" means here "finest, best, choiciest", and refers to "fleur de farine" (that is, the finest part of the flour). The French name translates therefore correctly as "Flour Mill" and not "Flower Mill". (In fact, it is the English pair "flour"/"flower" that derives from the single medieval French word flor/fleur, already carrying the two meanings. The term "flour" was spelled "flower" in English until the 19th century.)

One of the city's first neighbourhoods outside the original settlement, the Flour Mill was historically settled by Franco-Ontarian farmers and labourers. The neighbourhood's most notable surviving building, a large flour mill silo, was operated by the Manitoba and Ontario Flour Mill company starting in 1910. The silo is a prominent feature on Notre-Dame Ave, at St. Charles St. Other notable buildings include the Catholic parish church of Église St-Jean-de-Brébeuf and the École catholique Sacré-Coeur.

From the early 1900s into the 1960s, the neighbourhood was frequently flooded by spring runoff into Junction Creek. In some years, the flooding was so severe that it extended into downtown. Due to improved flood control practices within the Ponderosa Floodplain, however, the neighbourhood has not experienced a significant Junction Creek flood since the 1960s.

Following the mill's closure, there were frequent proposals to demolish the silo and redevelop the property. These proposals, and their attendant controversy, continued until the silo was designated a city heritage property in 1990. It celebrated its Centennial in 2011. The historic home of the mill's foreman was converted to a community museum, the Flour Mill Museum, in 1974. There is a parkette and historic plaque at the base of the silo.

In 2007, the neighbourhood faced conflict as its local business improvement association battled a city plan to widen Notre-Dame Avenue, a major city arterial that passes through the neighbourhood, to six lanes to accommodate expanded traffic. In 2013, three pedestrians were struck by vehicles while crossing Notre-Dame Ave in the area between King and Wilma streets, resulting in the death of one of the pedestrians. Cyclists in the area typically choose to ride on the sidewalk rather than risk riding on the road, which has a speed limit of 60 km/h. The business association also launched a neighbourhood beautification plan, including adding an "avenue of trees" to Notre-Dame, new benches and community banners, and the construction of a waterpark facility in the neighbourhood's O'Connor Park.

In August 2007, the city's Northern Life community newspaper published two articles calling attention to an abandoned cement factory just off a hiking trail near the neighbourhood, which had been used as an illegal dumping ground for garbage and chemicals as well as a local youth hangout. The factory's owners, Alexander Centre Industries, pledged to clean up the site a few days after the first article appeared, claiming that the facility had been abandoned for so long that nobody currently employed by the company even knew it existed until the controversy hit the press.

The residential Cambrian Heights neighbourhood extends northward from the Flour Mill along Cambrian Heights Drive. Collège Boréal and its campus is in this area. In the south-east part of the neighbourhood lies Primeauville, which consists of Leslie, Mont Adam, Harvey, Myles and Mountain and St-Joseph streets.  This area was named for a local priest and was separate from the rest of the Flour Mill until a bridge was built uniting what was then Pembroke Street off Notre-Dame, and Leslie Street. Previously, the only way to drive there was via Mountain Street.

Notable landmarks
 Flour Mill Silos - East side of Notre-Dame Ave at St. Charles St. Concrete silos painted yellow. The parkette includes miniature houses
 Catholic parish church of Église St-Jean-de-Brébeuf - 26 Kathleen St (Kathleen and Notre-Dame). Stone church with green spire.
 École catholique Sacré-Coeur - 261 Notre-Dame Ave (Notre Dame and Kathleen). Secondary school with large sports field.

Bell Park

The Bell Park neighbourhood, more commonly referred to as the Hospital area, although this term is out of date as most of the hospitals have been closed, centred on John and Paris Streets running north to Worthington Crescent, south to Science North at Ramsey Lake Road, west to Regent Street and eastward to McCrea Island. OIt is one of the oldest neighbourhoods in the city with homes dating from the late 1800s to the 1940s. The arts and crafts movement mansion of William J. Bell for whom this neighbourhood is named is in the heart of this area. It is currently home to the Art Gallery of Sudbury.  The Bell Park itself is part of his former estate land, donated to the city by the family in 1926 and hosts the finest beaches in downtown Greater Sudbury. The two gazebos in the park are named after William Bell and his wife, Katherine Bell. Two former mayors of the city are also honoured in the park grounds: the park's former amphitheatre was named for Grace Hartman. The boardwalk connecting the park to the nearby Science North site in the former Bell Grove, along the Lake Ramsey shoreline is named in honour of Jim Gordon. A bronze monumental sculpture to the city's mining heritage also overlooks the park site. Other notable buildings in this area include the Water Pumping Station/Hydro Building, the former residence of the President of Laurentian University, the former residence of the Grey Nuns, Science North, the Sudbury Yacht Club on Blueberry Island, Idylwylde Golf & Country Club, Health Sciences North (hospital) and Laurentian University. This neighbourhood also includes the areas known as Kingsmount, centring on Kingsmount Blvd and Killarney Ave., as well as the York Highlands and Bell Grove.

New Sudbury
The New Sudbury area, centred on Lasalle Boulevard running east–west and BarryDowne Road running north–south. In French, it is known as le Nouveau-Sudbury. This area was a former farming community, with only a handful of the old farm houses still standing. It includes a mix of commercial development along LaSalle, such as the New Sudbury Centre, the largest shopping mall in Northern Ontario, and residential properties on most of its streets. This community is home to the Adanac Ski Hill/Rotary Park/Nickedale Moraine, as well as Timberwolf Golf Course and Cambrian College. The area also includes the smaller neighbourhoods of Nickeldale, Barrydowne, Don Lita and Lebel.

The industrial area immediately surrounding the Sudbury Junction railway station may also be known as Sudbury Junction.

South End
The South End of Sudbury includes the urban neighbourhoods of Robinson, Lockerby, Algonquin, Moonglo, Nepahwin, and Lo-Ellen. The centre of the area is the Four Corners, a major commercial shopping district centred on the intersection of Regent Street, Paris Street and Long Lake Road. The Southridge Mall, located on the southeast quadrant of the Four Corners, is currently undergoing a major expansion.

The South End is currently one of the fastest-growing areas of the city, with significant commercial and residential development taking place especially in the Algonquin Road area. A significant controversy in recent years has involved the city's construction of a rock tunnel to increase the neighbourhood's sewer capacity — after a $4 million budget shortfall in the project, the city imposed a temporary levy on new development in the area.

Highway 17, the main route of the Trans-Canada Highway, passes through the South End along the Southwest Bypass. The government of Ontario has announced that the Highway 17 route will be converted to a freeway within the next decade; the highway already follows a freeway route further west in the Walden area. In preparation for the freeway conversion, the intersection of Highway 17 and Long Lake Road has been converted to a full interchange, which opened in 2008.

There are two public high schools, Lo-Ellen Park and Lockerby, and one Catholic high school, St. Benedict, in the South End area. There are also two French-language schools in the area: École publique Hélène-Gravel and École catholique St-Denis.

The more rural McFarlane Lake and Long Lake areas may also be grouped with the South End, or may be treated as distinct neighbourhoods. McFarlane Lake once was home to a French school and a French church, both named St-Mathieu.

West End
The West End is the area located immediately west of downtown, centred on the intersection of Regent (1890) pg 9 and Victoria (1909) pg 49 Streets up to the westernmost end of the original city limits, south to Byng Street. The neighbourhood is primarily residential in character with some commercial properties along Regent Street and community facilities including Queens Athletic Park, with its track & field oval that becomes a skating oval over the winter. The park was home to one of the old water towers built in the 1940s, demolished in 2011, part of a pair bookending Old Sudbury. The West End includes the smaller neighbourhoods of Elm West and Little Britain.

Notable landmarks 
 Northern Breweries - 185-227 Lorne Street (Lorne and Victoria Street). Large, vacant red brick factory building.
 Park Lawn Cemetery and Crematorium - 379 Horobin Street (Horobin and Arnley)
 The Societá Caruso or Caruso Club - 385 Haig Street (Haig and Whittaker). Large two-storey social club, banquet hall and restaurant with brown siding.
 Theatre Cambrian - 40 Eyre Street
 Queen's Athletic Field - 30 Cypress St, Sudbury
 Marguerite and Gerry Lougheed Community Park

Minnow Lake

Minnow Lake, one of the older residential areas in the former city, is centred on Howie/Bellevue/Bancroft Drives between the Kingsway (Municipal Road 55) and the north shore of Ramsey Lake, west to Moonlight Avenue. The area east of Second Avenue is sometimes known as Adamsdale. Minnow Lake also includes the eastern half of the Howey Drive area; the small neighbourhood centred on Howey Drive between Minnow Lake and downtown is occasionally known as Brodie. The small lake known as Minnow Lake can be seen from Bancroft Drive, Bellevue Street and Howie Drive, once had a sawmill operating on its shore, now there is the Millennium Fountain that shoots water in the air with coloured lights. The lake contains a couple of rocky islets: Du Caillaud Island and Romanet Island, named after a French count, Frédéric Romanet du Caillaud, who made Sudbury his home and left his mark upon it.
Minnow Lake is home to the Silver City, Sudbury Curling Club, Carmichael Arena and its skateboard park, the Civic Memorial Cemetery and Branch 76 of the Royal Canadian Legion, which boasts a WWII Sherman Tank. There are also scenic trails around the lake and up the nearby rocky hills both at Blueberry Hill and Oak Forest. There are three elementary schools in Minnow Lake: Adamsdale Public School, Pius XII Catholic School and École St-Pierre.

Donovan/Northern Heights

Centered on Frood Road northwest of downtown, Donovan refers to the area immediately surrounding the intersection of Frood, Kathleen (1908)pg 26 and Beatty (1920)pg 4, the lands between the two sets of railroad tracks.  While Northern Heights refers to the newer neighbourhood built in the 1970s to the north, between Rio Road (1964)pg 41and St-Roch Lane (1983)pg 44.

The area's narrow lots and laneways give it a distinctive appearance. Donovan Street (1928) was named for Timothy Donovan, farmer, who purchased the land from the crown.pg 13 After WWII, the area was settled by many Eastern European immigrants, mainly from Ukraine, Poland, Finland and the former republic of Yugoslavia. Each of these ethnic groups founded community halls in the Donovan.

The C1915 photo is a view of the Donovan District taken from the rocky hill overlooking Dupont Street (1928)pg 14. The road in the foreground is Bartram Avenue (1908)pg 60, renamed Frood Road in 1938pg 18 (Dupont is just out of view to the right of centre on Frood). The road on the right is Jean Street (1908) pg 24  . The white church on the bend of Jean Street is at Antwerp Avenue (1908)pg 3. The houses on the highest hill in the centre of the photo are on Burton Avenue (1908) pg 9. Mont St-Joseph, the hill separating the Flour Mill & the Donovan are behind them in the mid ground with Mont Adam in the far background.

Gatchell

This area is south west of downtown, nestled between the West End and Copper Cliff's industrial area, centred on Lorne Street between the Big Nickel and Regent Street at Ontario Street. The slag heaps framing this neighbourhood are in the process of being turned into green hills, disguising a century of slag dump build-up, 300m high. This area has small  lots, built mostly in the 1920s through 1940s. There are a large number of rental apartments in the area. The community is still very much a working class neighbourhood. The area was settled mainly by Italian immigrants, who helped found the local parish, St. Anthony. At the time, this area was home to the Western City Gate, long since demolished, a stone arch that was driven through on the way into town, one of two such gates in the city.

The community has four public elementary schools and three Catholic elementary schools.

The age of the community has provided a number of smaller shops and services conveniently scattered throughout its own commercial district mainly along Lorne Street. There are several large commercial and light industrial business as well.

The community is home to the Gatchell indoor swimming pool. Junction Creek is a natural landmark in this area and is currently undergoing a transformation as the Trans-Canada Trail is being constructed through the vacant lands along its banks. The neighbourhood's primary features are the Big Nickel numismatic monument park with its Dynamic Earth Centre and 'Delki' Dozzi Park, a park and sports complex that defines almost the entire northern boundary of the neighbourhood. The park was named after a prominent Italian-Canadian, local politician, Delchi Dozzi.

Copper Cliff

Copper Cliff, an area centred on Godfrey Drive and Creighton Road running south to Regional Road 55, was incorporated as a separate company town in 1901, and for a time was larger than the neighbouring community of Sudbury. However, Sudbury had surpassed Copper Cliff in population by 1930 when it was reincorporated as a city. The city of Sudbury attempted to annex Copper Cliff a number of times over the next 40 years, but was rebuffed by the Ontario Municipal Board because the city's desire to gain municipal taxation rights over Inco's mining facilities in the community was deemed incompatible with federal and provincial taxation rules around the mining industry. The neighbourhood was eventually annexed by the city in 1973 as part of the provincially mandated municipal restructuring which resulted in the creation of the Regional Municipality of Sudbury.

However, in many respects it continued to be treated as a distinct community rather than as part of the city. For example, postal service in Copper Cliff was never integrated into the city's urban forward sortation areas. Instead, Copper Cliff retained a rural P0M postal code.

Vale Inco's operations in the city are headquartered in the Copper Cliff area. Most notably, Copper Cliff is the location of the Inco Superstack, the tallest chimney in the Western Hemisphere and the second tallest in the world, which towers over Inco's main smelter facility. As a result of the high lead emissions from the Inco Superstack, the surrounding community of Copper Cliff was found to have levels of lead in soil tests at a level sufficient to cause harm to young children.

A local community museum, the Copper Cliff Museum, is located on the site of the very first homestead in what is now Copper Cliff.

The community is now located in Ward 2 on Greater Sudbury City Council, along with the former town of Walden. The location on the south western edge of old Sudbury gives it ready access to the Fielding Bird Sanctuary and Fielding Park along Kelley Lake, to the south west.

This area also includes the micro neighbourhood of Little Italy nestled at the base of the Inco Superstack. Centred on Diorite Street and Craig Street, the area is reminiscent of Italy, with its tiny winding streets and charm. The Societá italiana di Copper Cliff (Italian Club) is one of the oldest social clubs in the area.

References

External links
 History of Sudbury at Greater Sudbury Heritage Museums